Anne Baker MBE (née Salmond; born 14 May 1914) is a British writer of historical biographies and fundraiser.

Biography
Baker was born Anne Salmond just before the outbreak of World War I, the daughter of Sir Geoffrey Salmond who later became the professional head of the Royal Air Force. She was educated at Lady Margaret Hall, Oxford, and lived with her father and mother in both Egypt and India. She married Valentine Baker (1910–1979) and has five children. She lives in Salisbury and turned 100 in May 2014. Baker received a merit award from the National Society for the Prevention of Cruelty to Children (NSPCC) at the charity's Salisbury fundraising branch on 28 April 2017 for more than 50 years of volunteer work. In July 2019, she continued fundraising at the age of 105.

Baker was awarded an MBE in the 2021 New Year Honours for services to the NSPCC.

Works

Morning Star (1972), The life of Florence Baker, wife of the explorer Sir Samuel Baker
Wings over Kabul: The First Airlift (1975), Account of the Kabul Airlift, co-written with Sir Ronald Ivelaw-Chapman
A Question of Honour (1996), The Fall and Rise of Colonel Valentine Baker
From Biplane to Spitfire: The Life of Air Chief Marshal Sir Geoffrey Salmond (2003)

References

1914 births
Living people
English centenarians
English women writers
Members of the Order of the British Empire
People educated at Wirral Grammar School for Girls
Women centenarians
English military historians
English biographers